The Ciudad Deportiva del Real Oviedo, more commonly known as El Requexón, is the training ground and academy base of the Spanish football club Real Oviedo. Located at the northern outskirts of the city of Oviedo, the centre occupies an area of 80,447 m².

The first phase of the training centre was opened in 1969 by the efforts of then-club president Enrique Rubio Sanudo. Later in the 1980s, the second phase of the construction was completed by the efforts of then-president José Manuel Bango.

Facilities
 Ciudad Deportiva Stadium with a capacity of 3,000 seats, is the home stadium of Real Oviedo Vetusta, the reserve team of Real Oviedo.
 2 grass pitches.
 1 artificial pitch.
 1 mini grass pitches.
 Outdoor tennis courts.
 Service centre with gymnasium.

References

External links
Ciudad Deportiva del Real Oviedo
Estadios de España 

Real Oviedo
Requexón
Sports venues completed in 1969